This is a list of Degrassi: The Next Generation soundtracks.


Songs from Degrassi: The Next Generation

Songs from Degrassi: The Next Generation is a soundtrack album from the television series Degrassi: The Next Generation. It was released as a digital download on 1 November 2005, following the fourth season, and as a CD on 8 January 2007.

The N Soundtrack

Released following the fifth season in 2006, The N Soundtrack contains songs from Degrassi: The Next Generation, including the first recording by Degrassi actor turned rapper Drake, and other shows airing on Noggin's teen programming block, The N.

Music from Degrassi: The Next Generation

Music from Degrassi: The Next Generation is a soundtrack album from the television series Degrassi: The Next Generation. It was released as a digital download on 2 December 2008, following the seventh season, and as a CD on 9 December 2008.

Degrassi Goes Hollywood: Music from the Original Movie

During the eighth season, in 2009, Degrassi Goes Hollywood: Music from the Original Movie was released to coincide with the Degrassi Goes Hollywood film.

Degrassi Takes Manhattan: The Heat Is On

During the ninth season, in 2010, Degrassi Takes Manhattan: The Heat Is On (Music from the Original Movie) was released to coincide with the Degrassi Takes Manhattan film.

Degrassi: The Boiling Point

Degrassi: The Boiling Point (Music from the Series) (simply Degrassi: The Boiling Point in Canada) is a soundtrack album from the television series Degrassi. It was released as a digital download on 1 February 2011, following the first half of the tenth season, and as a CD on 22 February 2011.

References

Soundtracks
Degrassi: The Next Generation Soundtracks
Degrassi: The Next Generation